The women's 100 metres event at the 2002 African Championships in Athletics was held in Radès, Tunisia on August 6–7.

Medalists

Results

Heats
Wind:Heat 1: +4.7 m/s, Heat 2: +3.9 m/s, Heat 3: +3.9 m/s

Final
Wind: +4.1 m/s

References

2002 African Championships in Athletics
100 metres at the African Championships in Athletics
2002 in women's athletics